Gavanaj (also known as Gavanah, Gavanakh, Gavanīch, Goonaj, and Gūyanj) is a village in Niyarak Rural District, Tarom Sofla District, Qazvin County, Qazvin Province, Iran. At the 2006 census, its population was 196, in 48 families.

References 

Populated places in Qazvin County